Sean Paul Ryan Francis Henriques  (born 9 January 1973) is a Jamaican rapper and singer who is regarded as one of dancehall's most prolific artists.

Paul's singles "Get Busy" and "Temperature" topped the Billboard Hot 100 chart in the United States and most of his albums have been nominated for a Grammy Award for Best Reggae Album, with Dutty Rock winning the award. Paul has also been featured in many other singles including chart-toppers "Baby Boy" with Beyoncé, "What About Us" by The Saturdays, "Rockabye" by Clean Bandit (featuring Paul and Anne-Marie), and "Cheap Thrills" by Sia. "No Lie", "Cheap Thrills", and "Rockabye" each have over 1 billion views on YouTube, with "Rockabye" having reached over 2.7 billion views.

Early life 
Sean Paul Ryan Francis Henriques was born in Kingston, Jamaica, on 9 January 1973. His mother Frances, a painter, is of English and Chinese Jamaican descent. His Portuguese paternal great-grandfather's Sephardic Jewish family immigrated from Portugal to Jamaica in the 17th century, while his paternal grandmother was Afro-Jamaican. 

Paul was raised as a Catholic, though he also attended the Jewish private school Hillel Academy in Jamaica. Many members of his family are swimmers. His grandfather was on the first Sri Lankan men's national water polo team. His father also played water polo for the team in the 1960s, and competed in long-distance swimming, while Paul's mother was a butterfly swimmer. When Paul was 15, his father was arrested on charges of manslaughter and sentenced to 15 years in prison; he was released for good behaviour when Paul was 19.

Paul played for the national water polo team from the age of 13 to 21, when he gave up the sport in order to launch his musical career. He attended Wolmer's Boys' School and the College of Arts, Science, and Technology, now known as the University of Technology, where he was trained in commerce with an aim of pursuing an occupation in swimming.

Career

1994–2000: Early beginnings and rise to fame 
Former manager and producer Jeremy Harding's brother told him about a singer at a small open mic event in Kingston who sounded a lot like dancehall DJ and toaster Super Cat. Harding eventually met the singer when Paul came by his studio to ask for some advice. During the meeting, Paul recorded a vocal over Harding's rhythm track and in the process created the song "Baby Girl". Paul began hanging out at the studio every day, and the pair collaborated on several more tracks. When they recorded "Infiltrate" they decided they had something good enough to get on the radio. As Paul started to attract local attention, Harding began looking after his affairs. He later told HitQuarters that his support of Paul's fledgling career initially led him assuming the roles of "DJ, manager, road manager and security guard." Paul made a cameo appearance in the 1998 film Belly on stage performing. He made a successful collaboration with DMX and Mr. Vegas, "Top Shotter", to the soundtrack of the film. In 2000, Paul released his debut album, Stage One with VP Records.

2001–2015: Atlantic Records deal and international success 

In 2002, Paul continued his work with manager and producer Jeremy Harding, and after a joint venture deal with his label VP Records and Atlantic Records, announced the release of his second album, Dutty Rock. All of its hit singles would receive heavy airplay and rotation on MTV and BET. The first single "Gimme the Light" was an instant worldwide smash hit, reaching number 7 on the Billboard Hot 100. The second single "Get Busy" would end up topping the Billboard Hot 100, making it Paul's first number-one hit, it was also the first ever dancehall song to top the chart. Dutty Rock was a worldwide success, peaking in the top ten on the Billboard 200, was certified double-platinum by the RIAA and eventually selling over six million copies worldwide. Dutty Rock won the Best Reggae Album at the 46th Annual Grammy Awards in 2004. "Get Busy" was also nominated for Best Male Rap Solo Performance in that year. Simultaneously, Paul was featured on Beyoncé's U.S. number-one hit song "Baby Boy" and Blu Cantrell's "Breathe", although didn't perform well in the United States but was a massive hit in Europe. Both helped to push his reputation further still in the United States. This album not only further popularized dancehall music in the 2000s, but also helped developed and popularized the genre of dancehall pop, a musical fusion between the rhythmic styles and melodies of dancehall and pop music.

Paul's third album The Trinity was released on 27 September 2005. The album debuted at number 5 on the Billboard 200, breaking records with its first-week sales for a reggae/dancehall artist, eventually going Platinum in the United States and selling 4 million copies worldwide. The album produced five big hits, "We Be Burnin'", Ever Blazin'", "(When You Gonna) Give It Up to Me" (featuring Keyshia Cole), "Never Gonna Be the Same", and the U.S. chart-topping smash hit "Temperature", making it his third number-one hit on the Billboard Hot 100. The video of "(When You Gonna) Give It Up to Me" was featured in the film Step Up in 2006. He was nominated for four awards at the 2006 Billboard Music Awards, including Male Artist of the Year, Rap Artist of the Year, Hot 100 Single of the Year, and Pop 100 Single of the Year for "Temperature". He also won an American Music Award for "(When You Gonna) Give It Up to Me", beating Kanye West and Nick Lachey, who were also nominated for the award. "Send It On" from The Trinity featured on the 2005 Vauxhall Corsa advert. Paul often contributes his songs to various Riddim Driven albums by VP Records. In March 2007, he returned to Jamaica to perform at the 2007 Cricket World Cup opening ceremony.

Paul appears in the video game Def Jam: Fight for NY as part of Snoop Dogg's crew and again in the game's sequel, Def Jam: Icon.

Paul's fourth album Imperial Blaze was released on 18 August 2009. The lead single, "So Fine", which was produced by Stephen "Di Genius" McGregor, premiered on Paul's website on 25 April 2009.

The album consists of 20 tracks including "So Fine", "Press It Up", "She Want Me", and "Private Party", which are party tracks, and also love songs such as "Hold My Hand" (featuring Keri Hilson), "Lately", and "Now That I've Got Your Love", among others. Producers on the album include Don Corleone, Jeremy Harding, and Paul's brother Jason "Jigzagula" Henriques. All the songs of the album were added to Paul's Myspace page on the day of release of the album.

The album spawned eight music videos: "Always On My Mind" with Da'Ville, "Give It to You" with Eve, "Watch Dem Roll", "Back It Up" with Leftside, "Push It Baby" with Pretty Ricky, "Hit 'Em" with Fahrenheit and his brother Jason "Jigzagula" Henriques, "Come Over" with Estelle, and also the video of his first single, "So Fine".

Paul appeared in Shaggy's video, "Save a Life", which also includes appearances from Elephant Man and Da'Ville, among others. In an effort to raise money for a children's hospital, Shaggy, Paul, and others had a benefit concert. All proceeds went towards getting new equipment and technology 'For Aid to the Bustamante Hospital for Children'. During the premiere for M-Net's Big Brother Africa: All-Stars on 18 July 2010, he performed his songs "Temperature", "Hold My Hand", and "So Fine".

Paul's fifth album Tomahawk Technique was released on 24 January 2012. The first single, "Got 2 Luv U", features vocals from American singer Alexis Jordan. The song was written by Paul, Ryan Tedder, and Stargate, who also produced the song.

"She Doesn't Mind" is the second single from the album. It was written by Paul, Shellback, and Benny Blanco and was also produced by Shellback and Blanco. It was released on 29 September 2011 on NRJ and Skyrock (French radios), and to iTunes on 31 October. Like its proceeder, "Got 2 Luv U", it topped the charts in Switzerland, but it debuted at that spot. Paul appeared on the Never Mind the Buzzcocks episode, which aired on 21 November 2011.

Tomahawk Technique was released on 18 September 2012 in the U.S. The album was nominated for the Best Reggae Album at the 55th Annual Grammy Awards.

In 2011, Paul released his first riddim called "Blaze Fia Riddim" under Dutty Rock Productions, his own label.

In 2012, Paul was asked to team up with Congorock and Stereo Massive to feature vocals on their song "Bless Di Nation".

During 2013, Paul worked on his sixth studio album Full Frequency, which was released on 18 February 2014. The first single on the album, "Other Side of Love", was released to iTunes on 10 June 2013. The second single, "Entertainment 2.0", which features 2 Chainz and Juicy J, was released on 25 June 2013. Paul released the official remix to the song on 3 September 2013 with an additional feature from Nicki Minaj. "Turn It Up" was released as a single in the UK on 20 October 2013. It was to be released in Germany on 22 November 2013. "Want Dem All" was released as a single in the U.S. on 5 November 2013. The album features guest appearances from Damian Marley, Iggy Azalea, Brick & Lace, Konshens, Nicki Minaj, 2 Chainz, and Juicy J. Also in 2013, Paul was featured on the single "What About Us" by British girl group The Saturdays. The single went straight to the top of the Official UK Charts with over 100,000 sales in its first week, becoming the fastest selling single of the year at the time of release.

In January 2014, Paul was the main international artist at Fiestas Palmares 2014 in Costa Rica. Also in 2014, Paul was featured on the official English-language version of long-running Latin American chart-topper "Bailando" by Enrique Iglesias featuring Gente de Zona and Descemer Bueno. The video for the English version was shot concurrently with the video for the Spanish version in Santo Domingo in the Dominican Republic. The English version reached top 10 status in the United States and topping the charts of several other countries.

Paul appeared on the EP Apocalypse Soon by electronic music group Major Lazer, on the track "Come On to Me", which was released as the second single from the album, after "Aerosol Can", a collaboration with Pharrell Williams. He also collaborated with Nigerian singer Timaya on a remix of his song "Bum Bum". An accompanying video, directed by Shutah Films, was released online on 11 April. On 6 July 2015, Paul released the music video for his song "Take It Low" on the album Full Frequency.

2016–present: New label and commercial resurgence 
Paul had already became an independent artist after parting ways with Atlantic Records in September 2014.  Under new management of Jules Dougall of Dougall Group and Steve "Urchin" Wilson, Paul enjoyed a commercial resurgence in his career throughout 2016 after being featured on Australian singer Sia's remix version of her song "Cheap Thrills", it topped the Billboard Hot 100, making it Paul's first number-one hit on the chart since 2006. The song was also a global success, reaching number one in more than 15 other countries. It reportedly ended up becoming the most Shazamed song of 2016.

Following this resurgence, Paul signed a new record deal with Island Records in July 2016.

In October 2016, Clean Bandit released the song "Rockabye", which features Paul and English singer Anne-Marie. It peaked at number 9 on the Billboard Hot 100 and spent nine consecutive weeks at number one of the UK Singles Chart, and gained the coveted Christmas number one. The song would go on to become a massive global hit in 2017, reaching number one in 18 other countries. 

In November 2016, Paul cited Toots and the Maytals as inspiration when it comes to his own personal career longevity by saying, "I've seen some great people in my industry, you know, people like Toots... Toots and the Maytals. Toots he's a great reggae artist and he's still doing it... He's up there in years and he's doing it. Those kind of artists inspire me. I know I'm just going to keep on doing music as long as I can." 

On 18 November 2016, he released a new single "No Lie" (featuring Dua Lipa), which served as the lead single from his EP Mad Love the Prequel, which would be released in 2018, making it his first project release with Island Records. The song would eventually become a global phenomenon over the following six years after its release, it became a top-ten hit in 10 different countries and would end up becoming his most streamed song across streaming platforms, the music video, directed by Tim Nackashi, also surpassed 1 billion views on YouTube in April 2022, making it his most popular music video. 

One of the few other singles off the EP, "Mad Love", a collaboration with David Guetta, which features singer Becky G, would also make a global impact on the charts, peaking within the top 50 in multiple continents.

In March 2019, Paul collaborated with Colombian singer J Balvin on a bilingual song called "Contra La Pared", the song peaked within the top 15 of the Billboard Hot Latin Songs chart, making it his seventh entry on the chart. It was also a major hit in Spain, peaking in the top 10 on the nation's chart and was a top 30 hit in both Colombia and Argentina.

Paul had suggested that Jamaican musicians making use of "hardcore patois", a mixture of English with several languages spoken in Jamaica, create a language barrier that prevents them from becoming successful in the United States and the United Kingdom.

It was announced that he would receive the Order of Distinction (OD) from the Jamaican government on 21 October 2019, "for contribution to the global popularity and promotion of reggae music".

In August 2019, Paul was nominated alongside Drake, DJ Snake, and Snow for the Favorite Crossover Artist category at the 2019 Latin American Music Awards.

In March 2021, Paul released his seventh studio album called Live n Livin under his own label Dutty Rock Productions.

Paul collaborated with fellow Jamaican artists Spice and Shaggy for a dancehall single called "Go Down Deh". They performed the song live on Good Morning America, Jimmy Kimmel Live!, and The Wendy Williams Show. The song was massively well-received worldwide on the internet, and was named the "dancehall track of the year" for 2021 by NPR.

In May 2022, Paul released his eighth studio album Scorcha through Island Records.

In September 2022, Paul appeared in season 22 of The Voice as Gwen Stefani's coach advisor.

Business ventures
In 2011, Paul established his own record label, Dutty Rock Productions, along with his production team. In 2017, Paul signed Jamaican artist Chi Ching Ching to the label, making it the label's first signing. In 2022, in promotion of his eighth studio album Scorcha, he released his own brand of Jamaican patties called the "Scorcha Patty" along with its hot sauce in partnership with a United Kingdom-based Jamaican restaurant called Port Royal, which was made available for a limited time.

Philanthropy 
In 2016, Paul donated $1 million JMD towards Bustamante Hospital for Children. During the COVID-19 pandemic, Paul founded the "Sean Paul Foundation" in 2020, aiding less fortunate communities in Jamaica with donations of groceries to poor families and distribution of tablet computers to primary schools for students.

Activism
Paul has spoken out about climate change. In 2015, he attended the United Nations Climate Change conference, expressing concerns over pollution and has said that athletes in Jamaica are having to "run in smog". He has advocated for waste reduction, solar power and the use of electric cars. He collaborated with Paul McCartney, Natasha Bedingfield, Bon Jovi, Colbie Caillat, and various other artists on a single called "Love Song to the Earth" to spread awareness about climate change. In 2018, Paul was named an ambassador for climate change in the Caribbean. In 2022, Paul stated in his efforts to help combat climate change; "I have made the move to make my whole house solar powered. From the water to all the lights, And it runs my studio as well".

Personal life 
In 2012, Paul married his long-term girlfriend, Jamaican television host Jodi Stewart. In August 2016, it was announced that the couple was expecting their first child. On 26 February 2017, Paul announced the birth of his son, Levi Blaze. Their second child, Remi, was born on 20 August 2019.

Discography 

 Stage One (2000)
 Dutty Rock (2002)
 The Trinity (2005)
 Imperial Blaze (2009)
 Tomahawk Technique (2012)
 Full Frequency (2014)
 Live n Livin (2021)
 Scorcha (2022)

Filmography 

Film

Television

Video games

Awards and nominations

Grammy Awards 

!Ref.
|-
| rowspan="3"|2004
| Himself
| Best New Artist
| 
| rowspan="10"|
|-
| "Get Busy"
| Best Male Rap Solo Performance
| 
|-
| Dutty Rock
| rowspan="5"|Best Reggae Album
| 
|-
| 2006
| The Trinity
| 
|-
| 2010
| Imperial Blaze
| 
|-
| 2012
| Tomahawk Technique
| 
|-
| 2015
| Full Frequency
| 
|-
| 2017
| "Cheap Thrills" (with Sia)
| Best Pop Duo/Group Performance
| 
|-
| 2022
| Live n Livin
| rowspan="2"|Best Reggae Album
| 
|-
| 2023
| Scorcha
| 
|-

Other awards

See also 

 List of UK top-ten singles in 2017

References

External links 
 
 
 

1973 births
21st-century Jamaican male singers
21st-century Jamaican male musicians
Living people
Atlantic Records artists
Grammy Award winners
Island Records artists
Jamaican dancehall musicians
Jamaican pop singers
Jamaican male water polo players
Jamaican rappers
Jamaican reggae singers
Jamaican Roman Catholics
Jamaican people of African descent
Jamaican people of Chinese descent
Jamaican people of English descent
Jamaican people of Jewish descent
Jamaican people of Portuguese descent
Mad Decent artists
MTV Europe Music Award winners
Musicians from Kingston, Jamaica
Sportspeople from Kingston, Jamaica
VP Records artists